Fornalczyk is a Polish surname. Notable people with the surname include:

 Bogusław Fornalczyk (born 1937), Polish cyclist
 Mariusz Fornalczyk (born 2003), Polish footballer

Polish-language surnames